The Rough Guide to Congo Gold is a world music compilation album originally released in 2008. Part of the World Music Network Rough Guides series, the release focuses on the soukous genre of the Democratic Republic of the Congo, with tracks from the 1960s to 90s. The compilation was produced by Phil Stanton, co-founder of the World Music Network. Martin Sinnock compiled the tracks and wrote the liner notes, and Brad Haynes & Marisa Lassman coordinated the project.

Critical reception

The album met critical appraise upon release. In his review for AllMusic, Chris Nickson wrote that the album does a "first-rate job" in illustrating the genre and gives an "object lesson in what made it so wonderful". Robert Christgau called it "as playable as Afrocomps get". Writing for PopMatters, Nate Cunningham rose the issue of artists being "almost exclusively names you can find in the Wikipedia entry on soukous", but gave it a pass, saying it's less an "aural equivalent of a picture-postcard" than other introductory world music compilations. John Goddard of the Toronto Star agreed with Cunningham that "every artist belongs to the pantheon", but called every song a "nugget".

Track listing

References

External links
 
 

2008 compilation albums
World Music Network Rough Guide albums
World music albums by Democratic Republic of the Congo artists